The Treasure Coast Classic was a golf tournament on the Champions Tour from 1985 to 1986. It was played in Fort Pierce, Florida at the TPC at Monte Carlo.

The purse for the 1986 tournament was US$225,000, with $33,750 going to the winner. The tournament was founded in 1985 as the Sunrise Senior Classic.

Winners
Treasure Coast Classic
1986 Charles Owens

Sunrise Senior Classic
1985 Miller Barber

Source:

References

Former PGA Tour Champions events
Golf in Florida
Fort Pierce, Florida
Recurring sporting events established in 1985
Recurring sporting events disestablished in 1986
1985 establishments in Florida
1986 disestablishments in Florida
Treasure Coast